This is a timeline of sport in Greater Manchester,

19th Century

1810s
1816
 Manchester Cricket Club is founded

1840s
1842
 First use of referee in football. For a match in Rochdale, between the Bodyguards club and the Fearnaught club

1850s
1857
 Old Trafford Cricket Ground is opened in Old Trafford, Manchester as the home of Manchester Cricket Club

1860s
1864
 Lancashire County Cricket Club is formally constituted at a meeting of thirteen Lancashire cricket clubs in Manchester, with Old Trafford Cricket Ground as its home base
1865
 Lancashire County Cricket Club joins the County Championship and plays its initial important match against Middlesex at Old Trafford

1870s
1874
 Bolton Wanderers F.C. is formed
1878
 Newton Heath LYR Football Club is formed by the Carriage and Wagon department of the Lancashire and Yorkshire Railway depot at Newton Heath, Manchester (later known as Manchester United F.C.)

1880s
1880
 St Mark's (West Gorton) football club is formed in Manchester
1883
 Heaton Norris Rovers is formed (later to become Stockport County F.C.)
1884
 10–12 July – Old Trafford Cricket Ground hosts the first Ashes Test in England, which ends in a draw
1885
 Bury F.C. is established

1890s
1890
 Heaton Norris Rovers are renamed Stockport County F.C.
1893
 Manchester Football League is founded
1894
 31 March – Notts County F.C. defeat Bolton Wanderers 4–1 in the 1894 FA Cup Final
 St Mark's (West Gorton) football club and Aldwick Association FC are renamed Manchester City F.C.
1895
 Bury F.C. win the Second Division
 Pine Villa F.C. is founded (later to become Oldham Athletic A.F.C.)
1899
 Pine Villa F.C are renamed Oldham Athletic A.F.C.

20th Century

1900s
1900
 21 April – Bury F.C. defeat Southampton F.C. 4–0 in the 1900 FA Cup Final
1902
 J.H. Davies takes over near bankrupt Newton Heath (L&YR) F.C. and changes its name to Manchester United F.C.
1903
 18 April – Bury F.C. defeat Derby County F.C. 6–0 in the 1903 FA Cup Final
1904
 23 April – Manchester City F.C. defeat Bolton Wanderers F.C. 1–0 in the 1904 FA Cup Final, to win their first FA Cup
1907
 Rochdale A.F.C is founded
1908
  Manchester United F.C. win their first league (First Division) title
1909
 24 April – Manchester United defeat Bristol City F.C. 1–0 in the 1909 FA Cup Final, to win their first FA Cup
 Manchester United win the inaugural Charity Shield

1920s
1923
 28 April Bolton Wanderers defeat West Ham United F.C. 2–0 in the 1923 FA Cup Final, the first final to be held at Wembley, known as the White Horse Final
 Manchester City move to Maine Road
1926
 24 April – Bolton Wanderers defeat Manchester City 1–0 in the 1926 FA Cup Final
 Belle Vue Stadium is opened as a greyhound racing track in Belle Vue, Manchester. It has also been used for motorcycle speedway, as the home ground of Elite League team Belle Vue Aces from 1988 until 2015, and from 1999 until 2019 for stock car racing and banger racing
1928
 White City Speedway (Manchester) is opened for dirt track racing
1929
 27 April – Bolton Wanderers defeat Portsmouth F.C. 2–0 in the 1929 FA Cup Final, to win the FA Cup for the third time

1930s
1930
 White City Speedway (Manchester) is closed
1932
 Wigan Athletic F.C. is formed
1933
 29 April – Everton F.C. defeat Manchester City 3–0 in the 1933 FA Cup Final
1934
 28 April – Manchester City defeat Portsmouth F.C. 2–1 in the 1934 FA Cup Final
 84,569 watch Manchester City defeat Stoke City at Maine Road in the FA Cup 6th Round, the biggest crowd ever recorded for an English game outside of Wembley Stadium
1937
 Manchester City win their first-ever league title
1938
 Manchester City become the first and only defending Champions to be relegated

1940s
1948
 17 January – 83,260 watch Manchester United vs Arsenal at Maine Road, to become the highest attendance at an English league game
 24 April – Manchester United defeat Blackpool F.C. 4–2 in the 1948 FA Cup Final, to end a 37-year trophy drought
1949
 24 May - Radcliffe F.C. is founded

1950s
1952
 Manchester United win their first top-flight title in 41 years under the guidance of Matt Busby
1953
 2 May – Blackpool F.C. defeat Bolton Wanderers 4–3 in the 1953 FA Cup Final, which is still known as the 'Matthews Final'
1955
 7 May – Newcastle United F.C. defeat Manchester City 3–1 in the 1955 FA Cup Final
 Duncan Edwards, 18-year-old Manchester United wing-half, becomes England's youngest international when he plays in a side containing 40-year-old Stanley Matthews, who had played for England before Edwards was born
1956
 5 May – Manchester City defeat Birmingham City F.C. 3–1 in the 1956 FA Cup Final. German goalkeeper Bert Trautmann plays through the match despite suffering what an X-ray later confirms as a broken neck, and was able to continue his career
 Manchester United win the league championship, becoming England's first representatives in the European Cup, in the competition's second season, as the previous league champions Chelsea were blocked from entering the inaugural tournament by the Football Association
1957
 4 May – Aston Villa F.C. defeat Manchester United 2–1 in the 1957 FA Cup Final
 Manchester United win the league title for the second year running
1958
 6 February – Eight Manchester United players die and two more have their careers ended by injury after a plane crash near Munich-Riem Airport. Manager Matt Busby is badly injured and spends two months in hospital recovering from multiple injuries
 3 May – Bolton Wanderers defeat Manchester United 2–0 in the 1958 FA Cup Final
 Former Manchester United and Manchester City winger Billy Meredith dies aged 83

1960s
1960
 Oldham Athletic, league runners-up 45 years earlier, finish second from bottom in the Fourth Division but retain their league status after the Football League's members vote for Gateshead to go down and Midland League champions Peterborough United to go up for the 1960–61 season
1961
 Manchester City sell 21-year-old Scottish striker Denis Law to Torino of Italy in the first £100,000 deal involving a British club
1962
 26 April – Norwich City F.C. defeat Rochdale A.F.C 3–0 in the 1962 Football League Cup Final (first leg)
 1 May – Norwich City F.C. defeat Rochdale A.F.C 1–0 in the 1962 Football League Cup Final (second leg)
1963
 25 May – Manchester United defeat Leicester City F.C. 3–1 in the 1963 FA Cup Final, winning the FA Cup for the first time in 15 years and their first major trophy since the Munich Air Disaster five years earlier
 Curzon Ashton F.C. is founded in Ashton-under-Lyne, Greater Manchester
1965
 Manchester United win their first post Munich Air Disaster league championship
 Eric Brook, all-time record goalscorer for Manchester City, dies at the age of 57
1966
 Manchester United's Bobby Charlton is voted European Footballer of the Year
 Ramsbottom United F.C. is founded
1967
 Manchester United win the league championship – their fifth under Matt Busby and their seventh of all time, and last for the next 26 years, until the formation of the Premier League
 Goalkeeper Harry Gregg leaves Manchester United after 10 years during which he established himself as one of the best goalkeepers in the English game, but with no medals to show for it: he had missed the 1963 FA Cup final due to injury and had not played enough games to qualify for a medal when United won the league in 1965 and 1967
1968
 29 May - Manchester United defeat S.L. Benfica 4–1 in 1968 European Cup Final
 Manchester City wins the league championship for only the second time in their history
 George Best, 22, is voted European Footballer of the Year after a brilliant season which was rounded off by scoring a goal in the European Cup final
 Matt Busby is knighted after guiding Manchester United to the European Cup title
1969
 26 April – Manchester City defeat Leicester City F.C. 1–0 in the 1969 FA Cup Final
 Sir Matt Busby retires after 24 years as manager of Manchester United and is replaced by 32-year-old reserve team coach Wilf McGuinness

1970s
1970
 7 March – Manchester City defeat West Bromwich Albion F.C. 2–1 in the 1970 Football League Cup Final
 29 April - Manchester City defeat Górnik Zabrze 2-1 in the 1970 European Cup Winners' Cup Final
 Wilf McGuinness is sacked after 18 months in charge of Manchester United. Sir Matt Busby takes control of first-team affairs until the end of the season
1971
 1 July – Manchester United appoint Leicester City F.C.'s Frank O'Farrell as their permanent successor to Wilf McGuinness
1972
 December – Manchester United sack manager Frank O'Farrell and replace him with Scottish national coach Tommy Docherty
1973
 28 April - Scarborough F.C. defeat Wigan Athletic 2-1 in the 1973 FA Trophy Final
 Bobby Charlton and Denis Law both leave Manchester United after long and illustrious careers
1974
 2 March – Wolverhampton Wanderers F.C. defeat Manchester City 2–1 in the 1974 Football League Cup Final
 George Best finally leaves Manchester United after three years of uncertainty fuelled by off-the-field problems. He joins Stockport County
 Manchester United are relegated to the Second Division for the first time since the 1930s. Their fate is ironically sealed when former player Denis Law scores the winning goal for Manchester City at Old Trafford with his final touch in league football, but Birmingham City's victory would have condemned them to relegation regardless of the outcome of United's game
1975
 Manchester United are promoted back to the First Division one season after losing their top-flight status
1976
 28 February – Manchester City defeat Newcastle United F.C. 2–1 in the 1976 Football League Cup Final
 1 May – Southampton F.C. defeat Manchester United 1–0 in the 1976 FA Cup Final
1977
 21 May – Manchester United defeat Liverpool F.C. 2–1 in the 1977 FA Cup Final
 7–12 July - In the Second Test of the 1977 Ashes series at Old Trafford Cricket Ground  England defeat Australia by 9 wickets
 July – Tommy Docherty is sacked as manager of Manchester United just weeks after guiding them to FA Cup victory. He is replaced by Dave Sexton
1978
 Wigan Athletic are elected to the Football League in place of Southport
1979
 12 May – Arsenal F.C. defeat Manchester United 3–2 in the 1979 FA Cup Final

1980s
1980
 Manchester United chairman Louis Edwards, 65, dies of a heart attack weeks after being accused of financial irregularities by ITV. Control of the club passes to his son Martin
1981
 9 May – Manchester City draw 1–1 with Tottenham Hotspur F.C. in the 1981 FA Cup Final
 14 May – Tottenham Hotspur defeat Manchester City 3–2 in the 1981 FA Cup Final replay
 13–17 August - In the Fifth Test of the 1981 Ashes series at Old Trafford Cricket Ground  England defeat Australia by 103 runs
 Ron Atkinson replaces Dave Sexton as manager of Manchester United. Three months after his appointment, West Bromwich Albion midfielder, Bryan Robson, follows his old manager to Old Trafford for an English record fee of £1.75 million
1983
 26 March – Liverpool F.C. defeat Manchester United 2–1 in the 1983 Football League Cup Final
 21 May – Manchester United draw 2–2 with Brighton & Hove Albion F.C. in the 1983 FA Cup Final
 26 May – Manchester United defeat Brighton and Hove Albion 4–0 in the 1983 FA Cup Final replay, to win their first major trophy under the management of Ron Atkinson
 Sharp Electronics become the first official sponsors of Manchester United
 Manchester United and England winger Steve Coppell retires from playing at the age of 28 due to a knee injury
1984
 Manchester United sell England midfielder Ray Wilkins to A.C. Milan for £1.5 million and replace him with Scotland and Aberdeen's Gordon Strachan for £500,000
1985
 18 May – Manchester United defeat Everton F.C. 1–0 in the 1985 FA Cup Final
 1 June – Wigan Athletic defeat Brentford F.C. 3–1 in the 1985 Associate Members' Cup Final
 1–6 August - In the Fourth Test of the 1985 Ashes series at Old Trafford Cricket Ground Australia drew with England
1986
 24 May - Bristol City F.C. defeat Bolton Wanderers 3-0 in the 1986 Associate Members' Cup Final
 November - Manchester United manager Ron Atkinson is sacked after a poor start to the season, and is replaced by the successful Aberdeen manager Alex Ferguson
1987
 Alex Ferguson begins to rebuild Manchester United by signing Arsenal defender Viv Anderson, Celtic striker Brian McClair and Norwich City defender Steve Bruce
1988
 Mark Hughes returns to Manchester United after two years away for a fee of £1.8 million
1989
 28 May - Bolton Wanderers defeat Torquay United F.C. 4-1 in the 1989 Associate Members' Cup Final
 27 July-1 August - In the Fourth Test of the 1989 Ashes series at Old Trafford Cricket Ground Australia defeat England by 9 wickets 
 Alex Ferguson makes a host of big-money signings for Manchester United in his latest attempt to win them their first league title since 1967, paying a total of more than £7 million for Mike Phelan, Neil Webb, Paul Ince, Gary Pallister and Danny Wallace

1990s
1990
 29 April – Nottingham Forest F.C. defeat Oldham Athletic A.F.C. 1–0 in the 1990 Football League Cup Final
 12 May – Manchester United draw 3–3 with Crystal Palace F.C. in the 1990 FA Cup Final
 17 May – Manchester United defeat Crystal Palace 1–0 in the 1990 FA Cup Final replay, winning their first major trophy under the management of Alex Ferguson
 Manchester United and Arsenal were respectively deducted 1 and 2 points, for a 21-man brawl involving their players on the pitch.  The first and, so far, the only instances in English league history where a team were docked points for player misconduct
1991
 21 April – Sheffield Wednesday F.C. defeat Manchester United 1–0 in the 1991 Football League Cup Final
 15 May - Manchester United defeat FC Barcelona 2–1 in the 1991 European Cup Winners' Cup Final
 19 November - Manchester United defeat Red Star Belgrade 1-0 in the 1991 European Super Cup
1992
 12 April – Manchester United defeat Nottingham Forest F.C. 1–0 in the 1992 Football League Cup Final, winning the Football League Cup for the first time in their history
 16 May - Stoke City F.C. defeat Stockport County F.C. 1-0 in the 1992 Associate Members' Cup Final
 After a slow start to the new Premier League campaign puts their league title hopes under serious doubt, Manchester United pay Leeds United £1.2million for French striker Eric Cantona in hope of winning a title race
1993
 22 May - Port Vale F.C. defeat Stockport County F.C. 2-1 in the 1993 Football League Trophy Final
 3–7 June - In the First Test of the 1993 Ashes series at Old Trafford Cricket Ground Australia defeat England by 179 runs
 Manchester United win the inaugural Premiership title to end their 26-year wait for the league championship. They then paid a British record fee of £3.75 million for Nottingham Forest's Irish midfielder Roy Keane
1994
 27 March – Aston Villa F.C. defeat Manchester United 3–1 in the 1994 Football League Cup Final
 14 May – Manchester United defeat Chelsea F.C. 4–0 in the 1994 FA Cup Final to become only the fourth club in the 20th century to win the league championship and FA Cup double. They achieve this just four months after the death of former manager Sir Matt Busby at the age of 84. They are denied an unprecedented 'treble' by Aston Villa, who defeat them in the final of the League Cup
 14 September - Manchester Velodrome is opened
 Club and former England captain Bryan Robson leaves Manchester United after 13 years to become player-manager of Middlesbrough
1995
 January – Manchester United break the English transfer fee record by paying Newcastle United F.C. £7 million for striker Andy Cole 
 2 April – Liverpool F.C. defeat Bolton Wanderers 2–1 in the 1995 Football League Cup Final
 20 May – Everton defeat Manchester United 1–0 in the 1995 FA Cup Final, to leave Manchester United without a major trophy for the first time since 1989
 Manchester Storm ice hockey team is formed
 Manchester United's French striker Eric Cantona is banned from football for 8 months and sentenced to 120 hours community service for kicking a Crystal Palace spectator at Selhurst Park
1996
 11 May – Manchester United defeat Liverpool F.C. 1–0 in the 1996 FA Cup Final, to win a unique second league championship and FA Cup double
 28 August-1 September - 1996 UCI Track Cycling World Championships held at Manchester Velodrome
1997
 3–7 July - In the Third Test of the 1997 Ashes series at Old Trafford Cricket Ground Australia defeat England by 268 runs
 After captaining Manchester United to their fourth Premiership title in five seasons and 11th English League Championship overall, Eric Cantona announces his retirement as a player
 Bolton Wanderers move into the Reebok Stadium, leaving Burnden Park, their home for 102 years
1998
 Manchester City are relegated to the third tier of the English league for the first time in their history
1999
 18 April - Wigan Athletic F.C. defeat Millwall F.C. 1-0 in the 1999 Football League Trophy Final
 22 May – Manchester United defeat Newcastle United F.C. 2–0 in the 1999 FA Cup Final
 26 May - Manchester United defeat FC Bayern Munich 2-1 in the 1999 UEFA Champions League Final, to complete a unique treble of the Premier League title, FA Cup and European Cup, and manager Alex Ferguson is honoured with a knighthood
 27 August - S.S. Lazio defeat Manchester United 1-0 in the 1999 UEFA Super Cup
 Wigan Athletic, who had played at Springfield Park since their formation in 1932, relocate to the new 25,000-seat JJB Stadium

21st Century

2000s
2000
 26–30 August - 2000 UCI Track Cycling World Championships held at Manchester Velodrome
 FA Cup holders Manchester United decline to defend their trophy, instead electing to take part in the inaugural FIFA Club World Championship
2001
 Manchester United become only the fourth English club to win three successive league championships
 Les Sealey, who kept goal for Manchester United in their FA Cup triumph of 1990 and the European Cup Winners' Cup triumph of 1991, dies of a heart attack aged 43
 Manchester United break the national transfer fee record twice – first by paying PSV Eindhoven £19million for Dutch striker Ruud van Nistelrooy, and then by paying Lazio of Italy £28.1million for Argentine midfielder Juan Sebastián Verón
2002
 Commonwealth Games held in Manchester
 Manchester United break the British transfer record again by paying Leeds United £29million for central defender Rio Ferdinand
2003
 2 March – Liverpool F.C. defeat Manchester United 2–0 in the 2003 Football League Cup Final
 Manchester United overhaul Arsenal during the final weeks of the season to claim their eighth Premiership title in eleven seasons
 Manchester City leave Maine Road after 80 years and move into the 48,000-seat City of Manchester Stadium which had been constructed for the previous year's Commonwealth Games
2004
 29 February – Middlesbrough F.C. defeat Bolton Wanderers 2–1 in the 2004 Football League Cup Final
 22 May – Manchester United defeat Millwall F.C. 3–0 in the 2004 FA Cup Final, winning the FA Cup for an eleventh time
 Everton striker Wayne Rooney, still only 18, becomes the world's most expensive teenager when he signs for Manchester United in a transfer deal which could eventually rise to £25million from an initial £20million
 Middlesbrough beat Bolton Wanderers 2–1 in the League Cup final
2005
 21 May – After a 0–0 draw in the 2005 FA Cup Final Arsenal F.C. defeat Manchester United 5–4 on penalties
 11–15 August - In the Third Test of the 2005 Ashes series at Old Trafford Cricket Ground Australia drew with England
 George Best, widely regarded one of the greatest footballers in the history of Manchester United and the footballing world, dies aged 59 after a short illness
 Wigan Athletic reach the top division for the first time in their history after finishing runners-up in the Football League Championship
 The Glazer takeover of Manchester United leads to disgruntled fans creating F.C. United of Manchester
2006
 26 February – Manchester United defeat Wigan Athletic F.C. 4–0 in the 2006 Football League Cup Final
 March - Manchester Futsal Club is founded
 In their first season as a top division club and only their 28th in the professional leagues, Wigan Athletic finish tenth and are League Cup runners-up to Manchester United
2007
 19 May – Chelsea F.C. defeat Manchester United 1–0 in the 2007 FA Cup Final to secure a cup double, in the first final at the new Wembley Stadium. Ryan Giggs set a new record for the player to appear in the most finals. 
 Manchester United win the Premiership for the ninth time under Sir Alex Ferguson.
2008
 26–30 March - 2008 UCI Track Cycling World Championships held at Manchester Velodrome
 21 May - Manchester United draw 1-1 with Chelsea F.C., but win 6-5 on penalties, in the 2008 UEFA Champions League Final
 29 August - FC Zenit Saint Petersburg defeat Manchester United 2-1 in the 2008 UEFA Super Cup
 Dimitar Berbatov completes a move to Manchester United from Tottenham Hotspur for £30.75 million
 Manchester City are purchased by the Abu Dhabi United Group and on the same day broke the transfer record by purchasing Robinho of Brazil for £32million
 Manchester United win the Premier League for the 10th time and overall 17th English League Championship. It is also the tenth title for manager Sir Alex Ferguson (now the longest serving manager in English football with 22 years of unbroken service at the club) and Ryan Giggs, the only player to have collected title medals with all 10 of their championship winning sides since 1993
2009
 1 March – Manchester United draw 0–0 with Tottenham Hotspur F.C., but win 4–1 on penalties, in the 2009 Football League Cup Final, winning their third Football League Cup
 27 May - FC Barcelona defeat Manchester United 2-0 in the 2009 UEFA Champions League Final
 Manchester United become the first team to win three consecutive top division titles on more than one occasion
 Cristiano Ronaldo becomes the most expensive footballer in the world when Manchester United sell him to Real Madrid for £80million

2010s
2010
 28 February – Manchester United defeat Aston Villa F.C. 2–1 in the 2010 Football League Cup Final
2011
 14 May – Manchester City defeat Stoke City 1–0 in the 2011 FA Cup Final, claiming a major trophy after 36 years
 28 May - FC Barcelona defeat Manchester United 3-1 in the 2011 UEFA Champions League Final
 August - National Indoor BMX Arena is opened at Sportcity, Manchester
 Manchester United win a record-setting 19th top-flight title
2012
 Manchester City wins the Premier League title ahead of rivals Manchester United on goal difference, their 3rd overall English league win, and becomes the first team relegated from the Premier League to win the title. This was also their first English league title success since 1968
2013
 11 May – Wigan Athletic F.C. defeat Manchester City 1–0 in the 2013 FA Cup Final, to win the FA Cup for the first time, but are relegated from the Premier League, becoming the first FA Cup winners to be relegated in the same season as their Cup win
 1–5 August - In the Third Test of the 2013 Ashes series at Old Trafford Cricket Ground Australia drew with England. England retained The Ashes as a result
 Alex Ferguson retires after winning Manchester United's  20th league title
2014
 2 March – Manchester City defeat Sunderland A.F.C. 3–1 in the 2014 Football League Cup Final
 Louis van Gaal is confirmed as manager of Manchester United. Former interim manager Ryan Giggs is named as his assistant, and confirms his retirement as a player at the age of 40 after nearly a quarter of a century during which he played 963 games and won an English record of 22 major trophies.
 Manchester City win their 2nd Premier League title
2016
 28 February – Manchester City draw 1–1 with Liverpool F.C., but win 3–1 on penalties, in the 2016 Football League Cup Final
 21 May – Manchester United  defeat Crystal Palace F.C. 2–1 in the 2016 FA Cup Final, to equal Arsenal F.C.'s record 12 FA Cups
 Manchester United sack manager Louis van Gaal despite winning the FA Cup, after a poor league season. Former Chelsea manager Jose Mourinho is appointed in his place
2017
 26 February – Manchester United defeat Southampton F.C. 3–2 in the 2017 EFL Cup Final
 24 May - Manchester United defeat AFC Ajax 2-0 in the 2017 UEFA Europa League Final. Jose Mourinho becomes the only Manchester United manager to win a major trophy in his first season, with a League Cup and Europa League double
 8 August - Real Madrid CF defeat Manchester United 2-1 in the 2017 UEFA Super Cup
2018
 25 February – Manchester City defeat Arsenal F.C. 3–0 in the 2018 EFL Cup Final
 14 March - Arsenal W.F.C. defeat Manchester City W.F.C. 1-0 in the 2018 FA WSL Cup Final
 19 May – Chelsea F.C. defeat Manchester United 1–0 in the 2018 FA Cup Final
 Manchester City win the Premier League title and become the first club to win the Premier League with 100 points
 Salford City Lionesses is founded
2019
 23 February - Manchester City W.F.C. draw 0-0 with Arsenal W.F.C., but win 4-2 on penalties, in the 2019 FA WSL Cup Final
 24 February – Manchester City draw 0–0 with Chelsea F.C., but win 4–3 on penalties, in the 2019 EFL Cup Final
 18 May – Manchester City defeat Watford 6–0 in the 2019 FA Cup Final, becoming the first English team to win a domestic treble (FA Cup, EFL Cup and Premier League)
 27 August - Bury F.C. is expelled from the English Football League due to inability to furnish proof of its financial viability.
 4–8 September - In the Fourth Test of the 2019 Ashes series at Old Trafford Cricket Ground Australia defeat England by 185 runs to retain The Ashes
 December - Bury A.F.C. is founded
 Manchester City become the first team to win back-to-back Premier League titles since Manchester United in 2009

2020s
2020
 1 March – Manchester City defeat Aston Villa F.C. 2–1 in the 2020 EFL Cup Final
 27 November - Bury F.C. enter administration
2021
 13 March - Salford City F.C. draw 0-0 with Portsmouth F.C., but win 4-2 on penalties, in the 2020 EFL Trophy Final
 25 April – Manchester City defeat Tottenham Hotspur F.C. 1–0 in the 2021 EFL Cup Final, winning the EFL Cup for the fourth consecutive season and eighth in total
 26 May - Villarreal CF draw 1-1 with Manchester United, but win 11-10 on penalties, in the 2021 UEFA Europa League Final
 29 May - Chelsea F.C. defeat Manchester City 1–0 in 2021 UEFA Champions League Final
 Manchester City  win their seventh Premier League title
 Jack Grealish becomes the most expensive English footballer of all time after a transfer to Manchester City for £100 million
2022
 5 March - Manchester City W.F.C. defeat Chelsea F.C. Women 3-1 in the 2022 FA Women's League Cup Final
 Manchester City F.C. win the Premier League for the 8th time

References

Sport
Sport in Manchester